Arnica  is a genus of perennial, herbaceous plants in the sunflower family (Asteraceae). The genus name Arnica may be derived from the Greek arni, "lamb", in reference to the plants' soft, hairy leaves. Arnica is also known by the names mountain tobacco and confusingly, leopard's bane and wolfsbane—two names that it shares with the entirely unrelated genus Aconitum.

This circumboreal and montane (subalpine) genus occurs mostly in the temperate regions of western North America, with a few species native to the Arctic regions of northern Eurasia and North America.

Arnica species are used as food plants by the larvae of some Lepidoptera species, including Bucculatrix arnicella.

Arnica was previously classified in the tribe Senecioneae because it has a flower or pappus of fine bristles.

Characteristics

Arnica plants have a deep-rooted, erect stem that is usually unbranched. Their downy opposite leaves are borne towards the apex of the stem. The ovoid, leathery basal leaves are arranged in a rosette.

The phyllaries (a bract under the flowerhead) has long spreading hairs. Each phyllary is associated with a ray floret. Species of Arnica, with an involucre (a circle of bracts arranged surrounding the flower head) arranged in two rows, have only their outer phyllaries associated with ray florets. The flowers have a slight aromatic smell.

The seedlike fruit has a pappus of plumose, white or pale tan bristles. The entire plant has a strong and distinct pine-sage odor when the leaves of mature plants are rubbed or bruised.

Arnica montana 

The species Arnica montana, native to Europe, has long been used medicinally, but the effectiveness of this use has not been substantiated.

Toxicity
Arnica montana contains the toxin helenalin, which can be poisonous if large amounts of the plant are eaten, and contact with the plant can also cause skin irritation.

Species

Accepted species:
 Arnica acaulis —Common leopardbane - eastern US from Alabama to New Jersey
 Arnica angustifolia —Narrowleaf arnica - Canada (from British Columbia to Quebec), US (Montana, Idaho, Wyoming, Colorado); Russia, Scandinavia
 Arnica cernua —Serpentine arnica - California, Oregon
 Arnica chamissonis —Chamisso arnica - US West of Rockies incl Alaska; Canada (British Columbia to Quebec plus Yukon + Northwest Territories)
 Arnica cordifolia —Heart-leaf leopardbane, heartleaf arnica - US West of Rockies plus Alaska + Michigan; Canada (from British Columbia to Quebec plus Yukon + Northwest Territories)
 Arnica dealbata  - California
 Arnica discoidea Rayless arnica - California, Oregon, Nevada, Washington
 Arnica fulgens Foothill arnica, orange arnica, shining leopardbane - USA= West of Rockies plus Michigan; Canada (from British Columbia to Manitoba)
 Arnica gracilis —Smallhead arnica (A. latifolia x A. cordifolia) - US (Montana, Idaho, Wyoming, Colorado, Oregon, Washington); British Columbia, Alberta, Northwest Territories
 Arnica griscomii - Russia, Canada, Alaska
 Arnica intermedia - eastern Russia (Yakutskiya, Khabarovsk, Magadan)
 Arnica lanceolata —Arnica, lanceleaf arnica - US West of Rockies plus Alaska, Maine New Hampshire, Vermont, New York State; Canada (British Columbia, Quebec, New Brunswick)
 Arnica latifolia —Broadleaf arnica - western US, western Canada
 Arnica lessingii —Nodding arnica - Kamchatka, Alaska, Yukon, Northwest Territories, British Columbia
 Arnica lonchophylla —Longleaf arnica - most of Canada; Alaska, Montana, Minnesota, South Dakota 
 Arnica longifolia —Longleaf arnica, spearleaf arnica - US West of Rockies, British Columbia, Alberta
 Arnica louiseana —Lake Louise arnica - British Columbia, Alberta
 Arnica mallotopus - Honshu Island in Japan
 Arnica mollis —Hairy arnica, wooly arnica - - US West of Rockies plus Alaska, New Hampshire + Vermont; Canada (from British Columbia to Quebec plus Yukon + Northwest Territories)
 Arnica montana — Mountain arnica - most of Europe plus Greenland; naturalized in India
 Arnica nevadensis —Nevada arnica - California, Oregon, Nevada, Washington
 Arnica ovata - British Columbia Alberta, Yukon, US West of Rockies 
 Arnica parryi —Nodding arnica, Parry's arnica - British Columbia, Alberta, Yukon, US West of Rockies 
 Arnica porsildiorum - Kamchatka, Yukon Northwest Territories 
 Arnica rydbergii —Rydberg arnica, Rydberg's arnica, subalpine arnica - British Columbia, Alberta, northwestern USA
 Arnica sachalinensis - Hokkaido, Sakhalin, Kuril, Irkutsk
 Arnica sororia —Twin arnica - British Columbia, Alberta, Saskatchewan, US West of Rockies
 Arnica spathulata —Klamath arnica - California Oregon
 Arnica unalaschcensis —Alaska arnica - Hokkaido, Honshu, Kamchatka, Sakhalin, Kuril, Alaska
 Arnica venosa —Shasta County arnica - California 
 Arnica viscosa —Mt. Shasta arnica - California, Oregon

References

External links

 

 
Asteraceae genera
Medicinal plants
Taxa named by Carl Linnaeus